Selina Heregger (born 29 April 1977) is an Austrian former alpine skier who competed in the 2002 Winter Olympics.

External links
 

1977 births
Living people
Austrian female alpine skiers
Olympic alpine skiers of Austria
Alpine skiers at the 2002 Winter Olympics
People from Lienz
Sportspeople from Tyrol (state)
20th-century Austrian women
21st-century Austrian women
Place of birth missing (living people)